Charles Robert Connell (September 22, 1864 – September 26, 1922) was a Republican member of the U.S. House of Representatives from Pennsylvania, and the son of William Connell.

Charles was born in Scranton, Pennsylvania, and graduated from Williston Academy in Easthampton, Massachusetts, in 1884. He engaged in mercantile pursuits with his father, and was also engaged in banking.

As an adult, he became interested in the Lackawanna Mills and subsequently served as president and treasurer of the Scranton Button Company from 1888 until his death. He also interested in other manufacturing enterprises and banking.

Connell was elected as a Republican to the 67th United States Congress in 1921, and served until his death in Scranton the next year. After his death, he was interred in Forest Hill Cemetery.

See also
List of United States Congress members who died in office (1900–49)

Sources

The Political Graveyard

1864 births
1922 deaths
Williston Northampton School alumni
Politicians from Scranton, Pennsylvania
Republican Party members of the United States House of Representatives from Pennsylvania